Walter Nicoletti (4 November 1952 – 23 September 2019) was an Italian professional football coach.

Career
Born in Santarcangelo di Romagna, Nicoletti was originally a teacher, having previously been a youth player at Cesena, where he played as a goalkeeper.

Nicoletti began his coaching career in the 1970s, initially managing Emilia-Romagna-based San Mauro, Savignano and Corpolo. In 1985, Nicoletti joined Vis Pesaro, staying with the club for four years. Nicoletti later managed Giarre, Taranto, Empoli, Pisa, Trapani, Gualdo, Livorno, Cesena, Pistoiese, Lucchese, Spezia and S.P.A.L. After retiring as a coach he became a professor and advisor to the Italian Football Coaches Association.

References

1952 births
2019 deaths
Italian footballers
A.C. Cesena players
Association football goalkeepers
Italian football managers
Empoli F.C. managers
Trapani Calcio managers
Spezia Calcio managers
S.P.A.L. managers
Taranto F.C. 1927 managers
Pisa S.C. managers
U.S. Livorno 1915 managers
A.C. Cesena managers
Serie B managers
Sportspeople from the Province of Rimini
Footballers from Emilia-Romagna